Burglengenfeld is a town in the district of Schwandorf, in Bavaria, Germany. It is situated on the river Naab, 22 km north of Regensburg.

Climate
Climate in this area has mild differences between highs and lows, and there is adequate rainfall year-round.  The Köppen Climate Classification subtype for this climate is "Cfb". (Marine West Coast Climate/Oceanic climate).

Anti-WAAhnsinns-Festival 

The Anti-WAAhnsinns Festivals in Burglengenfeld were political rock concerts, which took place in Germany in the 1980s. Their purpose was to support protests against a planned nuclear reprocessing plant Wackersdorf (German: Wiederaufbereitungsanlage Wackersdorf, abbreviated WAA Wackersdorf) in Wackersdorf.

Personalities 
 Louis IV, Holy Roman Emperor (1281 or 1282–1347), Emperor of the Holy Roman Empire, lived around 1300 for about two years in the castle
 Johann Michael Fischer (1692–1766), baroque master builder
 Carl Ludwig Koch (1778–1857), forester, entomologist and arachnologist

References

Schwandorf (district)